Butler Air Transport was an Australian airline founded by C. Arthur Butler to operate air transport primarily among New South Wales airports in Australia, from 1934 until 1959.

History
Arthur Butler, OBE (1902–1980) was an English-Australian aviator whose first aviation experience was as a toolmaker and later ground engineer in Sydney then Hay. Butler was engineer to pilot Francis Stewart Briggs who taught Butler to fly at Hay. After getting a pilot's license, he became a barnstormer before, in 1934, winning the contract for the Charleville to Cootamundra leg of the England-Australia airmail route. The Butler Air Transport Co lost the contract on the contract's expiry in 1938, but went on to operate as a civil airline, serving country towns in New South Wales and Queensland.

During World War II Butler Air Transport continued operating on a limited scale and also manufactured parts for the Australian war effort on a cost-recovery basis. At the end of the war, Butler registered Butler Air Transport Pty Ltd as a public company. It became the most successful airline in New South Wales, operating three Douglas DC-3s, Avro Ansons, De Havilland Herons and three Airspeed Ambassadors.

Butler encouraged employee ownership of the company, and in 1947, they owned 51 per cent.

In the late 1940s, the Chifley Labor Government sought to nationalise the airlines. In the early 1950s the coalition government abandoned nationalisation and instead adopted the Two Airlines Policy favouring Ansett Airways and Trans-Australia Airlines. Arthur Butler fought against the trend, including an intended buy-out in the early 1950s by Australian National Airways. In 1955 Butler acquired two Vickers Viscounts. Ansett Transport Industries acquired Australian National Airways in 1957, thus acquiring appreciable stock in Butler Air Transport, then acquired more from staff stockholders until it controlled Butler. Despite a legal and boardroom battle to retain or regain control, Arthur Butler lost. In late 1958, Butler was offered the position of Managing Director but instead left the company, which was effectively absorbed into Ansett as Airlines of New South Wales in 1959, then into Ansett Express.

Arthur Butler was made an Officer of the Order of the British Empire in 1958, for services to aviation.

Destinations
Butler Air Transport operated to the following airports:

See also
 List of defunct airlines of Australia
 Aviation in Australia

References

External links
 Butler Air Transport Co – images held by the Powerhouse Museum, Sydney
 Arthur Butler Archive – includes files and pilot logbooks
 Australian Airline Tickets – Airlines of N.S.W. – images of Butler baggage tags, circa 1954–55
 Australian Civil Aircraft   VH-AMA – AZY  Series – Ed Coates Collection:
 see 5 entries, including VH-AOG DC-3 (crashed and written off at Bourke, New South Wales on 15 December 1955)

Defunct airlines of Australia
Airlines established in 1934
Airlines disestablished in 1959
Australian companies established in 1934
1959 disestablishments in Australia